Louis Woodard Emerson (July 25, 1857 – June 10, 1924) was a U.S. Representative from New York.

Life
Born in Warrensburg, New York, Emerson attended the district schools, and was graduated from Warrensburg Academy. He engaged in the lumber, banking, and manufacturing business.

He was a delegate to the 1888, 1892 and 1896 Republican National Conventions.

He was a member of the New York State Senate (19th D.) from 1890 to 1893, sitting in the 113th, 114th, 115th and 116th New York State Legislatures.

Emerson was elected as a Republican to the 56th and 57th United States Congresses, holding office from March 4, 1899, to March 3, 1903.

He resumed former business activities in Warrensburg, New York, and died there June 10, 1924.
He was interred in the City Cemetery.

State Senator James A. Emerson was his brother.

References

1857 births
1924 deaths
Republican Party New York (state) state senators
People from Warrensburg, New York
Republican Party members of the United States House of Representatives from New York (state)